Anwar Rahmati (born 1959) is an ethnic Arab-Hazara politician in Afghanistan. He was a governor of Daykundi province beginning on November 22, 2018.
Previously he served as Governor of Sar-e Pol from  May 25, 2010 to April 3, 2012 and as Governor of Ghor from August 27, 2012 to June 27, 2015. Between 2004 and 2010 he was Chief of staff to Karim Khalili.

Early life 
Sayyed Anwar Rahmati Son of Sayyed Rahmat, is born in 1959 in Yakawlang district of Bamyan province. He studied his primary and middle school at his home district. He graduated from agriculture high school of Herat province in 1979. He is an ethnic Hazara.

See also 
 List of Hazara people
 List of current governors of Afghanistan

References

Notes 

Governors of Sar-e Pol Province
People from Kabul
Living people
People from Bamyan Province
Hazara politicians
1959 births